George Joseph Strickland (3 October 1942 – 23 June 2019) was an Australian politician.

He was born in Elsternwick but moved to Western Australia in 1946. He was a schoolteacher before entering politics. In 1989, he was elected to the Western Australian Legislative Assembly as the Liberal member for Scarborough; he moved to Innaloo in 1996. From 1990 to 1993, he was Shadow Minister for Community Services, Multicultural and Ethnic Affairs and Youth, but instead of assuming a ministerial portfolio after the Liberal win in 1993 he was appointed Chairman of Committees and Deputy Speaker, rising to the Speakership in 1997. He retired from politics in 2001.

References

1942 births
2019 deaths
Liberal Party of Australia members of the Parliament of Western Australia
Members of the Western Australian Legislative Assembly
Speakers of the Western Australian Legislative Assembly
21st-century Australian politicians